Bohemanflya ("Boheman peninsula") is a peninsula on the northwestern side of Isfjorden, in Oscar II Land on Spitsbergen, Svalbard. It is named after Swedish entomologist Carl Henrik Boheman. The Boheman Bird Sanctuary is located south of the peninsula. The southeastern spit on the peninsula is named Bohemanneset.

A claim of the coal reserves of Bohemanflya was delivered in 1899.

References

Peninsulas of Spitsbergen